Tarporley is a civil parish in Cheshire West and Chester, England. It contains 39 buildings that are recorded in the National Heritage List for England as designated listed buildings. It includes the large village of Tarporley; otherwise the parish is rural. Of the listed buildings, five are at Grade II*, the others are at Grade II. The Grade II* listed buildings are the church, a hotel in the village, the former market hall, a large house on the outskirts of the village, and a farmhouse just outside the village. Many of the listed buildings are in the village, and a high proportion of these are in its High Street. Outside the village, they are houses and associated buildings.

Key

Buildings

See also
Listed buildings in Clotton Hoofield
Listed buildings in Rushton
Listed buildings in Tilstone Fearnall
Listed buildings in Tiverton
Listed buildings in Utkinton

References
Citations

Sources

Listed buildings in Cheshire West and Chester
Lists of listed buildings in Cheshire
Listed